The 10.5" Corporate 14 Bolt Differential is a heavy duty differential found on many 1973-2013 Chevrolet and GMC trucks and SUVs, as well as certain versions of the Cadillac Escalade. Additionally, this differential is found on Chevrolet Express and GMC Savana vans produced from 1973 to current day. As the name implies, this differential has 14 bolts holding on the differential cover. The ring gear is not held on with 14 bolts, but rather 12. The 14 bolt differential is a popular axle swap option for Jeep Wrangler owners, and is referred to as the "corporate" 14 bolt because of the odd nature of GM's corporate structure in the 1970s.

Not to be confused with the GM 14-bolt 9 and 1/2 inch ring gear rear differential which has c clips to retain the axles unlike a free floating axle that the heavy duty big brother utilizes. The 9 and 1/2 inch is easily identified from the 10 and 1/2 inch by looking at the hub. If the hub protrudes through the center of the wheel, that indicates the more desirable 10.5 and 1/2 inch full floating rear axle. The 9 and 1/2 inch rear end, while durable in its own right, is generally regarded as less desirable in high torque applications.

  The 9-1/2 c clip rear was in both the Suburban and pickups in both 6 or 8 lug varieties.   33 spline axles. 
 and which was in production through 2009 and even available on a trailblazer SS, SAAB 97x. Ssr.

General specifications
  diameter ring gear
 Axles are 30 spline axles
  diameter shank on the pinion
 Gear ratios: 3.21, 3.42, 3.73, 4.10, 4.56, 4.88, 5.13, and 5.38
 Carrier break: 3.21:1 - 4.11:1 and 4:56 - 5.38
   axle spline diameter
  axle shaft diameter
 Axles are different lengths from side to side
 Removable pinion support
 Weight: 
 GAWR:  Max.
 Pinion supported with bearings on both sides of the teeth (straddle mount), which minimizes pinion deflection

Design
The first design was produced from 1973 to 1984. The first design remained unchanged until 1986. This design had drums that were held on by the wheel studs and had a smaller diameter pinion bearing than the second design. The second design was produced from 1986 to present. One change that occurred in the second design was that on some models the brake drum could be removed without having to remove the hub and axle shaft. Additionally, the pinion received a larger diameter bearing while the pinion stayed the same diameter, which increased the durability of the pinion. All these axle are full floating.

Brakes
Most of the 14 bolt differentials produced through model year 1998 were fitted with drum brakes, but some vehicles with the 14 bolt were upgraded to disc brakes in 1999. Drum brakes were offered on many full size GM vans for several more years, only by 2003 all vans came with disc brakes. The first design of this differential had three different diameter brake drums. At first the differential was released with drums small enough to fit  wheels. This is an area of the axle assembly that is commonly converted by the enthusiast to disc brakes for added braking performance and lower cost of maintenance.

Pinion
The pinion is supported both in front of and behind the pinion teeth, an arrangement often referred to as "straddle mounting".  Straddle mounting greatly reduces pinion deflection under high torque loads, conferring increased longevity and torque capacity. The pinion is also removable from the back as well making for easier access.

Re-purposing
The 10.5" 14 bolt differential and axle is quite popular with Jeep Wrangler owners who want to upgrade their standard Dana 30, Dana 35, or Dana 44 axle. While the 10.5" 14 bolt axle is heavier than the standard Dana axles offered on the Wrangler, it is much stronger. This increased strength allows Jeep Wrangler owners to mount up to 44" tires with sticky compound without concern about axle shaft breakage. Additionally, for Wrangler owners with high horsepower GM LS drivetrains, the 14 bolt can take the increased stress of these high horsepressure motors.  Many Wrangler owners will have up to 2 inches removed from the bottom of the 10.5" 14 bolt differential housing to maximize ground clearance.

Due to the popularity of GM trucks and vans, 10.5" 14 bolt axles are common in junkyards. This makes them an option for any number of vehicle customization projects, buggy builds, and even classic trucks.

11.5 AAM

The 11.5 AAM 14 bolt rear differential began to replace the 10.5" 14 bolt in many Chevrolet Silverado and GMC Sierra trucks beginning in the 2001 model year. However, the 10.5" 14 bolt axle continues in production today on GMC Savanna and Chevrolet Express vans. The 11.5" 14 bolt axle is also used in 3rd Generation Dodge Ram 2500 and 3500 trucks. The GM version uses a paper gasket and the Ram version uses a re-usable rubber gasket. This attribute also makes the Dodge and GM axles appear very different, because of the different cover used. The GM AAM axle tubes are reduced to smaller diameter than the AAM Dodge's at the spindle from the housing, from 4" to 3.5". Newer GM trucks are built to the same specs as the Dodge axles. GM also opted to have a vibration dampener installed on the yoke, while Dodge opted to place the dampener on the drive shaft. This became the standard axle on all 2500 and 3500 RAM trucks for model year 2014.

Features
Increased GAWR:  Max.
1541 alloy axle shafts
Larger ring and pinion than the "14 bolt" axle.  As well as other components.
Although pinion is overhung/no support bearing like the 14 bolt.
Selectable locking differential on Ram Power Wagon (2014 and newer.)

10.5 AAM
2500 3rd Generation Dodge trucks use a 10.5 AAM in all the V8 equipped trucks. Some early model Diesel and V10 trucks also used this axle.  Like the 11.5, this axle also uses a re-usable rubber gasket and looks similar to the 11.5 axle. The Ram Power Wagon also uses this axle with a locking differential.  2013 was the last model year that RAM 2500 and 3500 trucks were equipped with this axle.

See also
 Powertrain
 Gear train
 Dana 60
 Ford 9-inch axle

References

External links
 http://www.4wheeloffroad.com/techarticles/drivetrain/131_0605_gm_14_bolt_axle_rebuild_parts/index.html 
 http://www.pirate4x4.com/tech/billavista/14b_bible/index.html

Automobile axles
Chevrolet
GMC (automobile)